Raeva is a surname. Notable people with the surname include:

Alexandra Raeva (born 1992), Russian curler
Bilyana Raeva (born 1973), Bulgarian politician
Iliana Raeva (born 1963), Bulgarian gymnast

See also
Rava (disambiguation)